Campbell Mountain is located in the Livingston Range, Glacier National Park in the U.S. state of Montana. The mountain is named after Archibald Campbell, who played a role in mapping the international border.

Climate
Based on the Köppen climate classification, it is located in an alpine subarctic climate zone with long, cold, snowy winters, and cool to warm summers. Temperatures can drop below −10 °F with wind chill factors below −30 °F.

Geology

Like other mountains in Glacier National Park, it is composed of sedimentary rock laid down during the Precambrian to Jurassic periods.

See also
 List of mountains and mountain ranges of Glacier National Park (U.S.)

References

Livingston Range
Mountains of Glacier County, Montana
Mountains of Glacier National Park (U.S.)
Mountains of Montana